Cuba is a ghost town in Becker County, in the U.S. state of Minnesota.  Cuba was named after the island of Cuba, a location in the Spanish–American War.

References

Ghost towns in Minnesota